Wang Lei is the first Chinese woman and the first Asian American who have climbed the Seven Summits and skied to both the North Pole and South Pole, the so-called Explorers Grand Slam.

Lei was born in Nan Tong of Jiang Su province and grew up in Beijing. Both her parents are engineers. She holds a B.S. degree in Computer Science from Tsinghua University in Beijing, an M.S. degree in Computer Science from the University of North Carolina at Chapel Hill, and an MBA degree in Finance and Marketing from the Wharton School.

On May 24, 2010, Lei summited Mount Everest and became the first Chinese woman and the first Asian American who has successfully climbed the highest peak on each of the seven continents and skied to both the North Pole and the South Pole. 

Time table of Lei's Adventure:

2003 Kilimanjaro

2005 Elbrus

2007 Mount McKinley (Denali)

2007 Carstensz Pyramid (Puncak Jaya)

2007 Vinson Massif

2008 South Pole

2008 Aconcagua

2008 North Pole

2010 Mount Everest

References

External links 
 Lei Wang on CNN 
 Lei Wang on CCTV
 Lei Wang on South China Morning Post
 Lei Wang on National Geographic
 Lei Wang's website

Living people
American mountain climbers
American sportspeople of Chinese descent
Chinese mountain climbers
Sportspeople from Nantong
Year of birth missing (living people)
Tsinghua University alumni
University of North Carolina at Chapel Hill alumni
Wharton School of the University of Pennsylvania alumni